Saaya (translation: Shadow) is a 2003 Indian Hindi supernatural fantasy romantic thriller film directed by Anurag Basu and produced by Mahesh Bhatt. It is an adaptation of the 2002 Hollywood film Dragonfly.

Plot
Akash "Akki" and his wife Maya are doctors. When malaria strikes India on the Burmese border, pregnant Maya rushes over to help, despite Akki's disapproval. Akash soon receives the news of her death caused by a bus crash. The bus crashed into water at heavy rains.

Akash believes that on looking at the face of the corpse, one would be able to trace out the mentality of that person at the time of death; and so he desperately searches for the corpse of Maya. However he could not succeed. Akash cannot accept Maya's passing away and believes strongly that she did not die. Akash himself has paranormal experiences where he feels that Maya's soul is trying to communicate with him. He tries to communicate with her through the hospital patients who have faced a near-death experience. Every patient draws a strange symbol, and one corpse starts talking to Akash when he is alone. Tanya, a close friend of Maya, tries to console Akash, because when her lover died in an accident it was Akash who treated her. Now, she believes it is her turn, and she believes he is hallucinating.

With the help of a nun called Sister Martha and clues, Akash decides to go back to where it all began – the border. There, with the help of a guide, he tries to find out about Maya but is not very successful, following which Akash jumps off a waterfall near the crash site and finds the sunken bus. He sees Maya's spirit beckoning him, and she shows him her accident and the incidents that followed. He goes to the nearby village tribe and asks if they saved Maya. They say she died, but they saved her soul. They take Akash inside and show him a surprise – though Maya died, she gave birth to their daughter. Akash thus realises that Maya was teaching him to trust, because their baby survived among the tribe without any medical attention despite being premature. He also realises that Maya's spirit was trying to reach him so that he could meet their daughter. He takes their child home and lives happily ever after.

Cast
 John Abraham as Dr. Akash "Akki" Bhatnagar 
 Tara Sharma as Dr. Maya Bhatnagar, Akash's wife 
 Mahima Chaudhry as Tanya
 Zohra Sehgal as Sister Martha
 Rajendranath Zutshi as Moses
 Shreya Ghoshal - special appearance in song "Har Taraf"
 Akshita Mutreja - special appearance in the end as Akash's daughter
 Vishwajeet Pradhan as Dr. A. Mehta

Soundtrack

The music has been composed by Anu Malik and M. M. Keeravani(Guest Composer). The lyrics have been written by Sayeed Quadri & Praveen Bhardwaj. The soundtrack mostly consists of soulful tunes composed by Anu Malik and M. M. Keeravani(Guest Composer). The ghazal "Kabhi Khushboo", composed by Anu Malik, was a hit. The soundtrack is remembered for its decent numbers. Not only does Shreya Ghoshal sing the song "Har Taraf", she also makes a cameo appearance in the film as a school girl singing the song on screen. Also, K.K. was credited in "Har Taraf" in the original CD's, the male vocals of which are originally provided by Kunal Ganjawala. The song "O Saathiya", sung by Alka Yagnik and Udit Narayan, was originally recorded for the 1998 film Zakhm and song is written by Anand Bakshi, but was included in this album since it couldn't be used there. The same music was applied in the tracks "Aai Jo Teri Yaad", sung by Ghoshal, and its separate male version sung by Sonu Nigam.

Critical response
Taran Adarsh of Bollywood Hungama gave the film 1.5 out of 5 stars, writing "On the whole, SAAYA falls short of expectations. The film has some engaging moments that keep you hooked on to the goings-on, but a handful of well-executed sequences can never really undo the harm done by a weak script and more specifically, a hard-to-digest climax. At the box-office, the film has some chances in select cinemas of metros, but at most places, the 'saaya' of success will elude it!." Anupama Chopra writing for India Today stated "Debutant director Anurag Basu creates some striking sequences of suspense but his first half is excruciatingly slow. Moreover, only an actor with gargantuan talent and star power can carry a film in which he occupies almost every frame. Unfortunately, John Abraham who relies mostly on one tortured expression can't do it. What works better is Mahima Chaudhary's performance and Fuwad Khan's inventive cinematography.

Sukanya Verma of Rediff.com called it a "decent version of the original (Dragonfly)" but criticized it for being emotionless, stating "One point though: Saaya does not evoke a sigh, moisten your eyes, or create sympathy for its characters. And therein lies its drawback."

References

External links
 

2003 films
Indian ghost films
2000s Hindi-language films
2003 romantic drama films
Indian romantic drama films
2000s romantic thriller films
Indian romantic thriller films
Films scored by M. M. Keeravani
Films scored by Anu Malik
Indian remakes of American films
Indian fantasy thriller films
Films directed by Anurag Basu